Leonard Taylor may refer to:

 Leonard Taylor (basketball) (born 1966), American basketball player
 Lenny Taylor, American football wide receiver
 Lenny Taylor (football coach), Jamaican soccer coach
 Leonard Taylor (football manager), American soccer coach, active 2008
 Leonard Campbell Taylor (1874–1969), British painter
 Len Taylor (Leonard William Taylor, born 1952), Canadian politician